Cécile Tormay (8 October 1875/76 in Budapest – 2 April 1937 in Mátraháza) was a Hungarian writer, intellectual, right-wing political activist, literary translator, and social theorist.

Life 
Both her parents were of partly germanic origin. Her maternal great-grandfather, József Spiegel (Tüköry de Algyest), was a building contractor, helped István Széchenyi build the Chain Bridge. Her mother was Hermin Barkassy, from a magyar and saxon (Lutheran germans in Upper Hungary) family.
Her fraternal grandfather, Károly Krenmüller (Tormay), took part in the 1848-49 hungarian nationalistic revolution as an army major. The Tormay family received nobility in the late 19th century. Her father, Béla Tormay, was widely recognized as an expert on agriculture, was a member of the Hungarian Academy of Sciences and a State Secretary.  Cécile was a private student, she studied literary works in German, Italian, French and Latin. She translated the Little Flowers of St. Francis of Assisi into Hungarian.

Literary career 
Her first two novels were People of the Rocks (Emberek a kövek között, 1911) and The Old House (A Régi ház, 1914). She also wrote five short stories. However Bujdosó könyv (1923). The title is translated literally as The Proscribed Book, but an English translation was published as An Outlaw's Diary (1923). It provides a hostile account of the 1918–1919 revolution and the subsequent Hungarian Soviet Republic led by Béla Kun. She also bemoaned the division of the Kingdom of Hungary which led to territorial concessions to the Kingdom of Roumania, This book is cited as evidence of Tomay's anti-semitism as she claims that "The demon of the revolution is not an individual, not a party, but a race among the races. The Jews are the last people of the Ancient East who survived among the newer peoples of shorter history."

She was nominated for Nobel Prize in Literature twice: in 1936 and in 1937.

In 1936 she became a member of the International Institute of Intellectual Co-operation.

Private life 
Cecilé Tormay never married, did not have children, worked as an independent writer, and led a traditionally “male” life. It was in stark contrast to her radical right-wing political positions in favor of the traditional family. She became a part of a big public scandal when on October 30th, 1923, Count Rafael Zichy filed for divorce with his wife, Countess Eduardina Pallavicini (daughter of the economist Ede Pallavicini), based on charges of an “unnatural” relationship between his wife and Cecilé Tormay. This relationship caused a great scandal at the time and was widely commented on by the contemporary press to the point that the two women, to protect their image, decided to sue Count Zichy who was eventually -  on the personal intervention of Miklós Horthy himself - sentenced to one and a half years in prison. Despite the colossal legal documentation of the case, the only materials that survived were the decisions and sentencing of the courts and the testimonials of the servants. None of the minutes, expert opinions, and testimonials of prominent witnesses survived. The servants referred to Tormay as csira, a sprout - a rural dialect word, widely used to describe and conceptualize non-normative sexualities there (as servants claimed that Tormay loved Pallavicini "like a man"). 

Countess Pallavicini, however, was not the only woman in Tormay's life: as a young woman she travelled Europe with an Italian woman Francesca D’Orsay for fifteen years before the war; in the last decade of her life, they lived in Mátraháza, in the villa they bought together with Count Lajosné Ambrózy-Migazzi.

Far-right figure 
She was a great admirer of Mussolini. In 1932, on the tenth anniversary of the March on Rome, she met the Italian dictator, presenting him the good wishes of her Hungarian women's league in a speech in Italian.

From the 1990s Tomay has been revived by political groups such as Jobbik, who share her far-right and anti-semitic views. Gábor Vona praised her in a speech made in November 2009. In 2012 Fidesz, the party of the governing coalition, also was promoting Tormay. Máté Kocsis and Sándor Lezsák, both Fidesz members of the National Assembly of Hungary unveiled a statue of Tormay, hailing her as a “great patriot". This was followed by an attempt to rename streets in Budapest after such anti-semites as Tormay and József Nyírő, a member of the Nazi Arrow Cross Party. However the Budapest mayor, István Tarlós suspended this initiative, following an international outcry.

References

Sources 

 An outlaw's diary (1923)
 Budapest wants to name a street after the antisemitic writer (in German, cites Tormay in English)
 Jewish federation asks Budapest mayor to withdraw renaming of street after alleged anti-Semite

External links
 

1870s births
1937 deaths
Antisemitism in Hungary
Hungarian-German people
Hungarian women novelists
Writers from Budapest
20th-century Hungarian novelists
Hungarian people of the Hungarian–Romanian War
20th-century Hungarian women writers
Hungarian lesbian writers
Hungarian LGBT novelists
Lesbian novelists